Railroad Addition Historic District may refer to:

Railroad Addition Historic District (Flagstaff, Arizona), listed on the National Register of Historic Places in Coconino County, Arizona
Railroad Addition Historic District (Red Cloud, Nebraska), listed on the National Register of Historic Places in Webster County, Nebraska